Kyungyi Island is an island in the Andaman Sea, right off the coast of Mon State, in the southern area of Burma.

Geography

See also
List of islands of Burma

References 

Mon State
Islands of Myanmar